Park Sung-yeon is a South Korean actress.  She is known for her roles in dramas such as Love Alarm, Mine, Abyss, Reflection of You, Do Do Sol Sol La La Sol and Record of Youth.  She also appeared in movies The Silenced, Peppermint Candy, The Wailing, The Client, Vanishing Time: A Boy Who Returned and Believer.

Filmography

Television series

Film

Awards and nominations

References

External links 
 
 

1975 births
Living people
21st-century South Korean actresses
South Korean television actresses
South Korean film actresses